This list of mills in Failsworth, lists textile factories that have existed in Failsworth, Greater Manchester, England.

References

Bibliography

Failsworth
Failsworth
Failsworth
Mills in Failsworth
Failsworth
History of the textile industry
Industrial Revolution in England
Mills